West Dover Hundred is a hundred in Kent County, Delaware, United States. West Dover Hundred was formed in 1859 from Dover Hundred. Its primary community is Hartly.

References

External links
 West Dover Hundred, 
 West Dover Hundred, 

Hundreds in Kent County, Delaware